Southport Rugby Football Club is a rugby union club based in Southport, Merseyside, now playing their home matches at Waterloo Road in Hillside. The club participates in North 2 West.

History 
Southport Football Club was founded on 29 November 1872 and is one of the oldest rugby clubs in the world. The first president of the club was Samuel Swire, the Mayor of Southport.

The 'List of Matches' for 1879 records the club's colours as being blue, white and red, and the ground as Roe Lane, Southport. In 1881, after some heavy defeats, Southport Football Club switched to association football. Most of the rugby players made the switch to the round ball game, and with a lack of new recruits, the original club faded out. There was a merger with Southport Olympic and Southport Wasps, and games were played at a ground at the corner of Scarisbrick New Road and Ash Street, backing onto Southbank Road. Records show that Southport Olympic drew one game with Liverpool Old Boys. The Lancashire County Rugby Football Union was formed in Manchester in the same year, but Southport was not represented.

The club's familiar red, black and amber colours were first mentioned in a game with New Brighton in February 1888. After a number of years of little or no rugby due to inter-club conflicts over professional versus amateur status (which led to a number of clubs breaking away to form the Northern Rugby Football Union (the Rugby Football League), Southport Olympic completely reformed at Victoria Park, Southport and rejoined the Lancashire County Rugby Football Union in 1906. In April 1913, a proposal to drop the Olympic name in favour of Southport Rugby Union Football Club was carried at a general meeting.

When Britain joined the First World War in September 1914, an extraordinary meeting of the club cancelled all fixtures and recommended that all members 'join some military organisation'. Fourteen club members lost their lives in the war, including the 1914 club captain J.E. Grimshaw, who was killed in the Gallipoli Campaign while serving with the Lancashire Fusiliers.

The club returned to playing fixtures in 1919, and by 1922 it had 75 players and 176 patrons. The year 1926 saw the start of the last season at Victoria Park, and on 26 March 1927 the club celebrated the opening of the new ground at Waterloo Road with a victory over Preston Grasshoppers.

Southport RFC's first XV currently plays in North Two West in the Rugby Football Union Northern Division, and the club fields many sides at all age levels.

Senior: First XV, Second XV, Third XV, Ladies, U18 Colts
Junior: U13s to U17 Colts
Mini: U6s to U12s

Club Honours
Senior:
First XV
South Lancs/Cheshire 2 champions: 1996–97
North West 3 champions: 1997–98
South Lancs/Cheshire 3 champions: 2006–07
Merseyside (West) champions: 2015–16
Senior:
Second XV
North West League 4 (North) champions: 2011-12

Junior:
U18: Lancashire Colts Cup champions (2): 1972–73, 2018–19, North West Conference C champions: 2019-20
U17: RFU U17 National Plate champions: 2016–17, North West Conference C champions: 2011–12, North West Conference B champions: 2016–17, North West Conference D champions: 2019-20
U16: Lancashire Cup champions: 2016–17
U15: Lancashire Bowl champions: 2009-10
U14: Lancashire Plate champions: 2013-14
U13: Lancashire Plate champions: 2012-13

Current squad
The Southport senior first xv men squad for the 2021–22 season:

References

External links
Southport Rugby Football Club website

English rugby union teams
Rugby clubs established in 1872